Micropentila fuscula, the banded dots, is a butterfly in the family Lycaenidae. It is found in Nigeria and Cameroon. Its habitat consists of primary forests.

References

Butterflies described in 1898
Poritiinae
Butterflies of Africa
Taxa named by Henley Grose-Smith